Marc Douglas Chan Cagas IV (born April 24, 1976) is a Filipino politician. A member of the Nacionalista Party, he was elected in 2007 as a Member of the House of Representatives of the Philippines, representing the First District of Davao del Sur. He forfeited a run for re-election in 2013 in order to run for Governor of Davao del Sur. Cagas lost the election to the Liberal Party candidate, former Congressman Claude Bautista. In 2021, upon the death of his father he became governor of the province.

Justice Secretary Leila De Lima revealed over ANC that former congressmen Douglas Cagas and his son Marc Douglas Cagas IV of Davao del Sur (1st District) and Arrel Olaño of Davao del Norte (1st District) were among those charged after they were found to have channeled their Pork Barrel Funds to non-government organizations (NGOs) controlled by suspected pork barrel scam mastermind Janet Lim-Napoles between 2007 and 2009.

June 10, 2021, his father Douglas Cagas died due to complications of COVID-19 virus. In Philippines' order of succession, the vice governor takes over the office of the governor. Hence, he and his cousin, John Tracy, a board member, took over the offices of governor and vice-governor, respectively.

References

 

.

Attended the University of the East, College of Law, 1999 to 2004

People from Davao del Sur
1976 births
Living people
Members of the House of Representatives of the Philippines from Davao del Sur
Lakas–CMD (1991) politicians
Governors of Davao del Sur